The 2020–21 season was the 62nd season of the US Monastir men's basketball team and the 1st of the team in the Basketball Africa League (BAL).

On 27 April 2021, Monastir won its sixth Championnat National A championship, its third consecutive title in a row. In its debut season in the Basketball Africa League, the team dominated its way through the regular season, defeating all three opponents by a wide margin. After blowouts in the quarter- and semifinals, Monastir lost to Zamalek in the 2021 BAL Finals.

Roster

Championnat National A roster
The following was Monastir's roster for the 2020–21 Championnat National A season, led by head coach Safouane Ferjani.

BAL roster
The following was US Monastir's 13-man roster for the 2021 BAL season.

Championnat National A

Regular season

Play-offs

Semifinals

Finals

Tunisian Cup

Final

Basketball Africa League

Group phase

Games

Playoffs

Quarterfinals

Semifinals

Finals

Individual awards
BAL Sportsmanship Award: Makrem Ben Romdhane
All-BAL First Team:
Omar Abada
Wael Arakji
Makrem Ben Romdhane

Statistics

Source:

References

US Monastir